Yoram Moefana (born 18 July 2000) is a French rugby union player who plays for Bordeaux Bègles in the Top 14 and the French national team. His position is centre.

His uncle is current French international rugby player Sipili Falatea, who plays for Bordeaux Bègles too as a prop.

Early life
Originally from Futuna, Yoram Moefana was born into a rugby household with his uncles Tapu Falatea and Sipili Falatea being professional rugby players. He arrived in Metropolitan France at the age of 13 with his uncle. After having started rugby in Limoges, he joined the Colomiers academy.

Club career
After having made his debut in Pro D2 with Colomiers during the 2018–19 season, Moefana was recruited by Top 14 club Bordeaux Bègles in the summer of 2019.

International career
Yoram Moefana was called by Fabien Galthié to the French national team for the first time in 2020, for the Autumn Nations Cup.

In 2022, he won the 2022 Six Nations Championship and the Grand Slam, scoring a try against Scotland at Murrayfield whereas he was injured for the last game against England at the Stade de France.

International tries

Honours

France
 Six Nations Championship: 2022

References

External links 
 France profile at FFR
 Bordeaux Bègles profile

2000 births
Living people
French rugby union players
Union Bordeaux Bègles players
French people of Wallis and Futuna descent
Rugby union players from Wallis and Futuna
Rugby union centres
France international rugby union players
Rugby sevens players at the 2018 Summer Youth Olympics